Imai Kanehira (今井兼平, 1152-1184) was a military commander of the late Heian Period of Japan.

He was the milk brother of Minamoto no Yoshinaka. He became joint commander of Yoshinaka's faction during the Genpei War after Yoshinaka met up with him at Seta.

His first major engagement was the Siege of Fukuryūji, where he commanded the Minamoto besiegers who successfully captured the fort. He fought with the forces of Minamoto no Yoshitsune, who wanted to bring an end to Yoshinaka's tyranny. Imai commanded Yoshinaka's forces when the two cousins met at the Battle of Awazu in 1184. He held off the attacks of Minamoto no Noriyori for a long time. However, when he heard of Yoshinaka's death from an arrow, he committed suicide by leaping off his horse while holding his sword in his mouth. The noh play Kanehira is about his ghost relating the story of Yoshinaka and himself, and how he wanted to go to the other side.

References 

1184 deaths
Minamoto clan
Year of birth unknown
1152 births
People of the Genpei War
People of Heian-period Japan
Deified Japanese people
Suicides in Japan